UC-92 may refer to:

 , a World War I German coastal minelaying submarine
 Funk B, an airplane with a United States military designation of "UC-92"